Hall is one of the original 18 districts of the Australian Capital Territory. Hall is the smallest district in terms of area in the ACT.

Localities 

 Hall

References 

Districts of the Australian Capital Territory
1966 establishments in Australia